The intentional balk is a tactic used in baseball. It involves the pitcher deliberately balking in order to move a baserunner from second base to third base, in order to prevent sign stealing.

Early history 
The first known intentional balk in baseball—which was attempted for reasons unrelated to sign stealing—came about in the 1956 Claxton Shield, a multi-team tournament in Australia. Victoria and South Australia were contesting the final game of the tournament, and the standings were such that the outcome of the tournament could be determined by run differential. After playing to a tie and going into extra innings, South Australia held a 5–4 lead entering the bottom of the 12th inning; however, they knew that a one-run victory would not be enough to win the title on run differential. When Victoria had a runner on third base, South Australia attempted to allow that runner to score, in hopes of forcing another inning and then winning by more than a single run. After a failed attempt at throwing the ball out of play, the South Australia pitcher deliberately balked to try and send the runner home. However, the umpires ended the game and awarded it as a 9–0 forfeit win for Victoria on the basis of South Australia bringing the game into disrepute.

Major League Baseball 
Intentionally committing a balk in Major League Baseball (MLB) resulted from an idea raised by Los Angeles Dodgers coach Bob Geren, who came up with the concept during a spring training session as a way to prevent sign stealing. While non-electronic forms of sign stealing are legal in baseball, Geren stated it was an insurance mechanism so that a baserunner on second base would not be able to steal the signs and communicate them to the batter. Such an intentional balk was first used in MLB by Dodgers pitcher Kenley Jansen against the Chicago Cubs on June 15, 2019. In the ninth inning with the Cubs having a runner on second base and the Dodgers holding a 5–3 lead, Jansen indicated he intended to balk and tapped his foot repeatedly on the rubber to force the umpires to call a balk and move the runner to third base.

An intentional balk occurred at least twice during the 2021 season: on May 26 when the Cubs' Craig Kimbrel intentionally balked against the Pittsburgh Pirates to stop sign stealing in the ninth inning (the Cubs held a three-run lead at the time), and on September 6 when Collin McHugh of the Tampa Bay Rays intentionally balked against the Boston Red Sox in the 10th inning to avoid the runner at second base being able to steal signs (the Rays held a two-run lead at the time).

In 2022, MLB introduced PitchCom, an optional wireless communication system used by players in place of visible signs. In the absence of visible signs, the opportunity for a runner at second base to engage in sign stealing is removed, which in turn makes use of an intentional balk to advance such a runner unnecessary. Some teams chose not to use PitchCom and still opted to use the intentional balk as a defensive tactic.

References

External links 
 Kenley Jansen Intentionally Balks, a Breakdown via YouTube
 Craig Kimbrel - Intentional Balk via YouTube
 Collin McHugh Intentional Balk during Rays and Red Sox via YouTube

Baseball strategy
Baseball terminology